Rasuljon Abdurakhimov (born 3 October 1996) is an Uzbek gymnast. He competed in the 2020 Summer Olympics.

References

External links 
 

1996 births
Living people
People from Fergana
Sportspeople from Tashkent
Uzbekistani male artistic gymnasts
Olympic gymnasts of Uzbekistan
Gymnasts at the 2020 Summer Olympics
20th-century Uzbekistani people
21st-century Uzbekistani people